Gerald Alexander Ellison  (19 August 1910 – 18 October 1992) was an Anglican bishop and rower. He was the Bishop of Chester from 1955 to 1973 and the Bishop of London from 1973 to 1981.

Early life and education
Ellison was the son of a chaplain to the king. He was educated at Westminster School and New College, Oxford. He rowed for Oxford University Boat Club in the Boat Race in 1932 and 1933 and was later a Boat Race umpire. He married and had three children.

Ordained ministry
Ellison studied for ordination at Westcott House, Cambridge and was ordained deacon in 1935 and priest in 1936. His first position, from 1935, was as a curate at Sherborne. He then became the chaplain to Cyril Garbett, Bishop of Winchester, from 1937 to 1939. During World War II he was a chaplain in the Royal Naval Volunteer Reserve and in 1943 the domestic chaplain to Cyril Garbett as Archbishop of York. From 1946 to 1950 he was vicar of St Mark's Portsea, Portsmouth, the largest parish of the city.

Episcopal ministry
In 1950, Ellison was consecrated to the episcopate as Bishop of Willesden, a suffragan bishop in the Diocese of London. In 1955 he became the Bishop of Chester, (in which capacity he blessed a nuclear submarine at Birkenhead) and then, in 1972, the Bishop of London, where he completed a move from Fulham Palace to a residence in Westminster. Another lasting legacy of his in the Diocese of London is the area scheme he began. He was appointed a Knight Commander of the Royal Victorian Order in 1981 and after retirement was for a short time vicar general in the extraprovincial Diocese of Bermuda.

See also

List of Oxford University Boat Race crews

References

External links
Bishop Ellison's papers are at Lambeth Palace Library

1910 births
People educated at Westminster School, London
Alumni of New College, Oxford
Royal Naval Volunteer Reserve personnel of World War II
Bishops of Willesden
Bishops of Chester
Members of the Privy Council of the United Kingdom
Bishops of London
Deans of the Chapel Royal
20th-century Church of England bishops
Knights Commander of the Royal Victorian Order
Stewards of Henley Royal Regatta
Officers of the Order of St John
1992 deaths
Royal Navy chaplains
World War II chaplains